A suicide crisis, suicidal crisis or potential suicide is a situation in which a person is attempting to kill themselves or is seriously contemplating or planning to do so. It is considered by public safety authorities, medical practice, and emergency services to be a medical emergency, requiring immediate suicide intervention and emergency medical treatment. Suicidal presentations occur when an individual faces an emotional, physical, or social problem they feel they cannot overcome and considers suicide to be a solution. Clinicians usually attempt to re-frame suicidal crises, point out that suicide is not a solution and help the individual identify and solve or tolerate the problems.

Nature

Most cases of potential suicide have warning signs. Attempting to kill oneself, talking about or planning suicide, writing a suicide note, talking or thinking frequently about death, exhibiting a death wish by expressing it verbally or by taking potentially deadly risks, or taking steps towards attempting suicide (e.g., obtaining rope and tying it to a ligature point to attempt a hanging or stockpiling pills for an attempted overdose) are all indicators of a suicide crisis. More subtle clues include preparing for death for no apparent reason (such as putting affairs in order, changing a will, etc.), writing goodbye letters,  and visiting or calling family members or friends to say farewell. The person may also start giving away previously valued items (because they "no longer need them"). In other cases, the person who seemed depressed and suicidal may become normal or filled with energy or calmness again; these people particularly need to be watched because the return to normalcy could be because they have come to terms with whatever act is next (e.g., a plan to attempt suicide and "escape" from their problems).

Depression is a major causative factor of suicide, and individuals with depression are considered a high-risk group for suicidal behavior. However, suicidal behaviour is not just restricted to patients diagnosed with some form of depression. More than 90% of all suicides are related to a mood disorder, such as bipolar disorder, depression, or other psychiatric illnesses, such as schizophrenia. The deeper the depression, the greater the risk, often manifested in feelings or expressions of apathy, helplessness, hopelessness, or worthlessness.

Suicide is often committed in response to a cause of depression, such as the cessation of a romantic relationship, serious illness or injury (like the loss of a limb or blindness), the death of a loved one, financial problems or poverty, guilt or fear of getting caught for something the person did, drug abuse, old age, concerns with gender identity, among others.

In 2006, WHO conducted a study on suicide around the world. The results in Canada showed that 80-90% of attempts failed (an estimation, due to the complications of predicting attempted suicide). 90% of failed suicides investigated led to hospitalizations. 12% of attempts were in hospitals.

Treatments

Ketamine has been tested for treatment-resistant bipolar depression, major depressive disorder, and people in a suicidal crisis in emergency rooms, and is being used this way off-label. The drug is given by a single intravenous infusion at doses less than those used in anesthesia, and preliminary data have indicated it produces a rapid (within 2 hours) and relatively sustained (about 1–2 weeks long) significant reduction in  symptoms in some patients. Initial studies with ketamine have sparked scientific and clinical interest due to its rapid onset, and because it appears to work by blocking NMDA receptors for glutamate, a different mechanism from most modern antidepressants that operate on other targets. Some studies have shown that lithium medication can reduce suicidal ideation within 48 hours of administration.

Intervention 
Intervention is important to stop someone in a suicidal crisis from harming or killing themselves. Every sign of suicide should be taken seriously. Steps to take in order to help defuse the situation or get the person in crisis to safety include:
 Stay with the person so they are not alone.
 Call 988 (if in the U.S.) or another suicide hotline, or take the person to the nearest hospital facility.
 Reach out to a family member or friend about what is going on.

If a friend or loved one is talking about suicide but is not yet in crisis, the following steps should be taken to help them get professional help and feel supported:
 Call a suicide hotline number; the U.S. numbers are 988 or 800-273-8255.
 Remove dangerous objects, such as guns and knives, from the home.
 Offer reassurance and support.
 Help the person to seek medical treatment.

See also 
 Depression
 Suicide
 Suicidal ideation
 Suicide prevention

References

External links 
 National Suicide Prevention Lifeline (US) - 24-hour, toll-free suicide prevention service for persons in a suicide crisis.
 Ligature Resistant - Preventing suicides.

Medical emergencies
Suicide prevention